The via dei Georgofili bombing (Italian: Strage di via dei Georgofili) was a terrorist attack carried out by the Sicilian Mafia in the very early morning on 27 May 1993 outside the Uffizi in Florence, Italy.

The via dei Georgofili bombing was carried out with a Fiat Fiorino packed full of explosives, parked near the Torre dei Pulci, between the Uffizi museum and the Arno River. The edifice was the seat of the Accademia dei Georgofili. The large explosion caused the death of five people: Angela Fiume (36 years old), employee and caretaker of the Accademia; her husband Fabrizio Nencioni (39 years old), policeman; their daughters Caterina Nencioni (50 days old); and Nadia Nencioni (nine years old); and Dario Capolicchio (22 years old), a junior student at the architecture class at  the university. Forty-eight other people were injured by the blast. The tower and other buildings were destroyed and others damaged, including the Uffizi Gallery, where three paintings were heavily damaged or destroyed, including Adoration of the Shepherds (1620) by Gerard van Honthorst (later partially recovered).

After Corleonesi Mafia clan boss Salvatore Riina was captured in January 1993, the mafia began a campaign of bombing Italian cultural heritage sites. Numerous terror attacks, including this one, were ordered as warning to its members to not turn state's witness, but also in response for the Italian state overruling of the Article 41-bis prison regime.

In June 1998, pentito Gaspare Spatuzza received a life sentence in relation to the bombing.

In 2000, Riina, Giuseppe Graviano, Leoluca Bagarella and Bernardo Provenzano were sentenced to life imprisonment for ordering the massacre.

References

1993 murders in Italy
20th century in Florence
20th-century mass murder in Italy
Attacks on buildings and structures in 1993
Attacks on buildings and structures in Italy
Car and truck bombings in Italy
Crime in Tuscany 
History of the Sicilian Mafia
Improvised explosive device bombings in 1993
Mass murder in 1993
Massacres in Italy
May 1993 crimes
May 1993 events in Europe
Organized crime events in Italy
Terrorist incidents in Italy in 1993
Building bombings in Europe
Events in Florence